The Women's 3 × 5 kilometre relay cross-country skiing event was part of the cross-country skiing programme at the 1972 Winter Olympics, in Sapporo, Japan. It was the fifth appearance of the event. The competition was held on 12 February 1972, at the Makomanai Cross Country Events Site.

Results

References

Women's cross-country skiing at the 1972 Winter Olympics
Women's 4 × 5 kilometre relay cross-country skiing at the Winter Olympics
Oly
Cross